John Derbyshire (born 3 June 1945) is a British-born American far-right political commentator, writer, journalist and computer programmer. He was once known as a paleoconservative, until he was fired from the National Review in 2012 for writing an article for an online magazine that was widely viewed as racist. He now holds a staff position at the white supremacist website VDARE.

In the article that caused his firing, Derbyshire suggested that white and Asian parents should talk to their children about the threats posed to their safety by black people. He also recommended that parents tell their children not to live in predominantly black communities. He included the line "If planning a trip to a beach or amusement park at some date, find out whether it is likely to be swamped with blacks on that date."

He has also written for the New English Review.  His columns cover a broad range of political-cultural topics, including immigration, China, history, mathematics, and race. Derbyshire's 1996 novel Seeing Calvin Coolidge in a Dream was a New York Times "Notable Book of the Year". His 2004 non-fiction book Prime Obsession won the Mathematical Association of America's inaugural Euler Book Prize. A political book, We Are Doomed: Reclaiming Conservative Pessimism, was released in September 2009.

Early life 
Derbyshire attended the Northampton School for Boys and graduated from University College London, of the University of London, where he studied mathematics.  Before turning to writing full-time, he worked on Wall Street as a computer programmer.

Career

National Review
Derbyshire worked as a writer at National Review until he was terminated in 2012 because of an article published in Taki's Magazine  that was widely perceived as racist.

Derbyshire then worked at VDARE.

Mathematics
Derbyshire's book Prime Obsession: Bernhard Riemann and the Greatest Unsolved Problem in Mathematics was first published in hardcover in 2003 and then paperback in 2004.  It focuses on the Riemann hypothesis, one of the Millennium Problems. The book is aimed, as Derbyshire puts it in his prologue, "at the intelligent and curious but nonmathematical reader ..."

Prime Obsession explores such topics as complex numbers, field theory, the prime number theorem, the zeta function, the harmonic series, and others.  The biographical sections give relevant information about the lives of mathematicians who worked in these areas, including Euler, Gauss, Lejeune Dirichlet, Lobachevsky, Chebyshev, Vallée-Poussin, Hadamard, as well as Riemann himself.

In 2006, Joseph Henry Press published another Derbyshire book of popular mathematics:  Unknown Quantity: A Real And Imaginary History of Algebra.

Role in Way of the Dragon
Derbyshire had an uncredited role in Way of the Dragon (released in the United States as Return of the Dragon), a 1972 martial arts film directed by, and starring, Bruce Lee. Of landing the part, Derbyshire said: "The casting director had obviously just trawled around the low-class guesthouses for unemployed foreigners of a sufficiently thuggish appearance."

Views 
Derbyshire writes in general from a small government conservative perspective. He notably ridiculed George W. Bush's "itty-bitty tax cut, paid for by dumping a slew of federal debt on your children and grandchildren," derided Bush as too sure of his religious convictions and for his "rich-kid-ness". He has noted that small-government conservatism is unlikely to ever take hold in the United States (although he is personally sympathetic to it), called for immediate U.S. withdrawal from Iraq (but favoured the invasion), opposed market reforms or any other changes in Social Security, supported legal access to abortion, supported euthanasia in a fairly wide range of circumstances, and suggested that he might (in a time of international crisis) vote for Hillary Clinton as president. Derbyshire wrote about American schooling in his book We Are Doomed, "Education is a vast sea of lies, waste, corruption, crackpot theorizing, and careerist log-rolling." He further argued that people "had better brace ourselves for the catastrophe" coming as a result.

Derbyshire once argued that America would be better off if women did not have the right to vote. In 2005, in a monthly column containing a series of miscellaneous musings, he controversially stated that women's physical attractiveness peaks between ages 15 and 20.

Vs National Review 
Derbyshire differed from other writers at National Review magazine on many subjects. For example, Derbyshire supported Michael Schiavo's position in the Terri Schiavo case. Derbyshire's views on the Schiavo case attracted criticism from colleagues such as Ramesh Ponnuru. The Derbyshire–Ponnuru dispute arose again over Ponnuru's 2006 book The Party of Death. Derbyshire reviewed the book harshly in the New English Review, and Ponnuru replied on National Review Online.

Though Derbyshire broadly agreed with other writers at National Review Online on immigration, he encountered strong opposition from former NRO blogger John Podhoretz, who described Derbyshire's comments on restricting immigration to maintain "ethnic balance" in severe terms: "But maintaining 'ethnic balance' is not fine. It is chillingly, horrifyingly not fine." In response, fellow Corner contributor Jonah Goldberg, who described himself as philosophically "in the middle" of the two, noted:

I should say that I think JPod is getting too hung up on the phrase "ethnic balance" as a codeword for all sorts of unlovely things. It seems to me that if you're going to sit down and have any immigration policy at all, it's unavoidable that you're going to address the issue of ethnic balance in one way or another, no matter what you call it. Ultimately, you have to choose where people come from if you have an immigration policy, even if you emphasize other factors like skills or family unification. So you can either look at it directly or you can skirt around it. But you can't avoid it.

Personal life
In 1986 Derbyshire married Lynette Rose, or Rosie, née Qi (齐 红 玫; Qi Hongmei), who was raised in China and later became a naturalised U.S. citizen. They have two children, a daughter and a son. He lives on Long Island, New York. Derbyshire was, for a brief time, an illegal immigrant. He often recounted observations from his personal life in his former monthly column, "The Straggler," in National Review. Derbyshire said of his family, "our two children are, as they are already tired of being told, half English coal miner, half Chinese peasant, 100 percent American."

In early 2012, he underwent treatment for chronic lymphocytic leukaemia.

Published works
 Seeing Calvin Coolidge in a Dream (St. Martin's Griffin, 1997) 
 Prime Obsession: Bernhard Riemann and the Greatest Unsolved Problem in Mathematics (Plume Books, 2003) 
 Unknown Quantity: A Real And Imaginary History of Algebra (Joseph Henry Press, 2006) 
 We Are Doomed: Reclaiming Conservative Pessimism (Crown Forum, 2009) , 
 From the Dissident Right (Vdare Books, 2013) 

He has also written numerous articles for various publications, including National Review, The New Criterion, The American Conservative and The Washington Times.

Derbyshire records a weekly podcast called "Radio Derb," in which he comments on current events. The podcast was hosted on the National Review website before being moved to Taki's Magazine. It is now hosted on VDARE.

References

External links

 John Derbyshire's home page, with archive of web and print articles

Interviews
 Radio Free Indiana: Interview with John Derbyshire  on The Voice of Reason Broadcast Network
 

1945 births
Alt-right writers
Alumni of University College London
American columnists
American computer programmers
American male non-fiction writers
American podcasters
American political commentators
American political writers
American science writers
American white supremacists
British emigrants to the United States
Living people
Mathematics popularizers
National Review people
Old Right (United States)
Paleoconservatism
People educated at Northampton School for Boys
People from Long Island
Writers from London
Writers from New York (state)